The Bait is a television film about LAPD Detective Tracy Fleming, who is out to catch a serial killer preying on women in Los Angeles. Filmed in 1971 and released in 1973, it stars Donna Mills. The film was based on former police officer Dorothy Uhnak's first novel, also titled The Bait, which won the MWA's Edgar for Best First Novel.  She was reportedly embarrassed over the liberties taken with her work by this film. The film itself was the pilot for an unlaunched weekly TV series.

The Ledger, a later book by Ms. Uhnak featuring the same character, NYPD Detective Christie Opara, was adapted into the TV-film Get Christie Love!  It also took liberties with the source material, but was, nonetheless, successfully turned into a TV series the following season.

See also
 List of American films of 1973

References

External links
 
 

1973 television films
1973 films
ABC Movie of the Week
American serial killer films
1970s English-language films
Fictional portrayals of the Los Angeles Police Department
Films based on American novels
Films based on crime novels
Films scored by Jack Elliott
Films set in Los Angeles
American police detective films
American thriller television films
1970s serial killer films
Films directed by Leonard Horn
1970s American films